Mixed team curling at the 2020 Winter Youth Olympics was held from 10 to 16 January at the Palladium de Champéry in Champéry, Switzerland.

Teams

Group A

Group B

Group C

Group D

Round Robin Standings

Round robin results
All draw times are listed in Central European Time (UTC+01).

Group A

Friday, January 10

Draw 1
9:00

Saturday, January 11
Draw 4
10:00

Draw 5
14:00

Draw 6
18:00

Sunday, January 12
Draw 9
18:00

Monday, January 13
Draw 11
14:00

Tuesday, January 14
Draw 13
10:00

Group B

Friday, January 10

Draw 3
18:00

Saturday, January 11
Draw 5
14:00

Sunday, January 12
Draw 7
10:00

Monday, January 13
Draw 10
10:00

Draw 11
14:00

Draw 12
18:00

Tuesday, January 14
Draw 15
18:00

Group C

Friday, January 10

Draw 2
14:00

Saturday, January 11
Draw 4
10:00

Sunday, January 12
Draw 7
10:00

Draw 8
14:00

Draw 9
18:00

Monday, January 13
Draw 12
18:00

Tuesday, January 14
Draw 14
14:00

Group D

Friday, January 10

Draw 1
10:00

Draw 2
14:00

Draw 3
18:00

Saturday, January 11
Draw 6
18:00

Sunday, January 12
Draw 8
14:00

Monday, January 13
Draw 10
10:00

Tuesday, January 14
Draw 13
10:00

Draw 14
14:00

Draw 15
18:00

Playoffs

Quarterfinals
Wednesday, January 15, 10:00

Semifinals
Wednesday, January 15, 14:00

Bronze medal game

Thursday, January 16, 12:00

Gold medal game

Thursday, January 16, 12:00

Final standings

The final standings were as follows:

References

External links

World Curling Federation

Mixed team
Olympics